The Fairless Local School District is a public school district in Stark County, Ohio, United States. The Pre–5 elementary school houses about 840 students as well as a small preschool wing, the middle school for grades 6–8 houses 440 students, and Fairless High School is home to 650 students in grades 9 through 12.

Schools
District administrative offices are located inside Fairless High School.

Fairless Elementary School
Grades K–5
Opened September 10, 2007
Fairless Middle School
Grades 6–8
Opened September 10, 2007
Fairless High School
Grades 9–12
Completed and opened August 1965
New hs currently being built

Historic schools
Navarre Elementary School, Navarre.  Demolished.
Brewster Elementary School, Brewster.  Demolished.
Beach City Elementary School, Beach City.  Demolished.
Wilmot Elementary School, Wilmot. Building now owned by Faith Christian Academy.

External links
 

School districts in Stark County, Ohio